Holy Roller or Holy Jumper are terms originating in the 19th century and used to refer to some Protestant Christian churchgoers in the Wesleyan-Holiness movement, such as Free Methodists and Wesleyan Methodists. The term describes dancing, shaking or other boisterous movements by church attendees who perceive themselves as being under the influence of the Holy Spirit. 

Holy Rolling is sometimes used derisively by those outside these denominations, as if to describe people literally rolling on the floor in an uncontrolled manner. Those within related Wesleyan traditions have reclaimed the term as a badge of honor.

Occasionally, they have been referred to as followers of the "pokeweed gospel" or members of the "lightning bug church."

Description 
Holy Roller refers to Protestant Christian churchgoers in the holiness movement, such as Free Methodists and Wesleyan Methodists. Holy Rolling is sometimes used derisively by those outside these denominations, as if to describe people literally rolling on the floor in an uncontrolled manner.

Many individuals in the wider Methodist tradition are also referred to by others as Shouting Methodists due to the ejaculatory prayers congregants often utter during the service of worship, such as "Praise the Lord!", "Hallelujah!", and "Amen!

Similar disparaging terms directed at outspoken Christians but later embraced by them include Jesus freaks or, from former centuries, Methodists, Quakers, and Shakers.

History
Merriam-Webster traces the word to 1841. The Oxford English Dictionary cites an 1893 memoir by Charles Godfrey Leland,  in which he says "When the Holy Spirit seized them ... the Holy Rollers ... rolled over and over on the floor." The term describes dancing, shaking or other boisterous movements by church attendees who perceive themselves as being under the influence of the Holy Spirit.

Those within related Wesleyan traditions have reclaimed the term as a badge of honor; for example William Branham wrote: "And what the world calls today holy-roller, that's the way I worship Jesus Christ." Gospel singer Andraé Crouch stated, "They call us holy rollers, and what they say is true.  But if they knew what we were rollin' about, they'd be rollin' too." Decades earlier, in the notes for his 1960 album Blues & Roots, jazz musician Charles Mingus used the term, seemingly neutrally and as a simple description, to indicate his own religious upbringing.

Usage

Politics 
Gifford Pinchot in 1919: "Apparently no meeting for any purpose is to be tolerated except the Holy Roller meetings themselves. These theoretically and in fact ... The Holy Roller church in this community, as elsewhere, in its total influence promotes immorality. ..."
 The New York Times on May 2, 1923: "Bound Brook Mob Raids Klan Meeting: Thousand Hostile Citizens Surround Church and Lock In 100 Holy Rollers. ... Until the arrival of eight State troopers to reinforce the local police here at 1 o'clock this morning about one hundred members of the Holy Rollers were ..."
 Time on October 12, 1936: "When Jesus Christ first appeared to His assembled disciples after His resurrection, He told them that believers 'shall speak with new tongues; they shall take up serpents' (Mark: 16:17, 18). To many a U. S. religionist of the Pentecostal or "Holy Roller" variety, the 'gift of tongues' has long been vivid reality.
 Sarah Palin on January 19, 2016, referred to some in the crowd as "holy rollers" when she endorsed Donald Trump: "Looking around at all of you, you hard working Iowa families, you farm families and teachers and teamsters and cops and cooks, you rock and rollers and holy rollers! You all make the world go around and now our cause is one."

Poetry 
G. K. Chesterton wrote a poem entitled "To A Holy Roller."

Music 
 Joe Hill's 1911 song "The Preacher and the Slave" contains the lines "Holy Rollers and Jumpers come out / And they holler, they jump and they shout".
 In the 1969 Beatles song "Come Together", the line "He one holy roller" can be heard within the first 15 seconds, referring to George Harrison's (Hindu) religiosity.
 The Scottish hard rock band Nazareth has a song titled "Holy Roller"—first officially released 1975 on Greatest Hits—which uses the term throughout the song's lyrics.
 "Holy Roller" is a song by Country Joe McDonald from his 1981 album Into the Fray.
 "Holy Roller" is the fourth track on t he album Apple released in July 1990 by Mother Love Bone
 Holy Roller is a 1999 compilation album by Reverend Horton Heat.
 In the 1982 stage musical Little Shop of Horrors, the song "Dentist" has the lyrics "When I start extracting those molars, you girls will be screaming like Holy Rollers"
 The Trance Zomba album by Argentine band Babasónicos features a song called "Patinador Sagrado", which in itself is a mistranslation of the term, using it in the sense of rollerskating, a trend that continues throughout the song's lyrics.
"Ms. Holy Roller" is the fifth track on Will Smith's 2005 album "Lost and Found".
Holy Roller is the first track on the 2007 album Venom & Tears by the American metalcore/groove metal/hardcore punk band Throwdown.
 The American rock band Portugal. The Man released a song titled “Holy Roller (Hallelujah)” on their 2013 album Evil Friends.
Spoon's 2014 single "Inside Out" contains the line "I don't make time for holy rollers".
 The 2014 Thank You Scientist song "Feed The Horses" contains the line, "I won't be your holy roller..."
 "Holy Roller" is the title of the 10th track on the 2015 Awolnation album Run.
The phrase is also the name of the 9th song on The Amazons' debut album from 2017.
”Traveling On”, a 2018 song by the Portland folk rock band The Decemberists, contains a reference to holy rollers.
"Holy Roller" is also the title of the seventh track on the 2020 album Walking Like We Do by The Big Moon.
Holy Roller is a 2020 song by the Canadian metalcore band Spiritbox.
"Holy Rollers" is a song by Canadian alternative rock band Sons of Freedom, from their eponymous 1988 debut album.
 "Holy Roller" is the protagonist from the song "Servitude" from the American rock band Fishbone.

Television 
In the 12th episode of the seventh season of The Simpsons, "Team Homer", one of the rival bowling teams, made up of important figures from the local church, is named "The Holy Rollers."

Sports 
The "Holy Roller" play was a game winning play executed by the Oakland Raiders to beat the San Diego Chargers on September 10, 1978. Quarterback Ken Stabler fumbled the ball forward and several Raiders teammates (Pete Banaszak and Dave Casper) aided the ball's roll into the end zone for the game winning touchdown. The NFL amended its rules in the off-season to prevent the recurrence of such a play.

See also 

Entire sanctification
Camp meeting
Tent revival

References

English phrases
Religious slurs for people
Holiness movement
Methodism